Edward Anthony Ashton (1 March 1946 – 28 May 2001) was an English rock pianist, keyboardist, singer, composer, producer and artist.

Biography
Born in Blackburn, Lancashire, Ashton spent his formative years in the seaside town of Blackpool where his parents had an upright piano. When he was a child, his mother sent him to piano lessons. At the age of 13 in 1959, while Ashton was a student at St. George's School, Blackpool, he joined a local group, The College Boys, on rhythm guitar and piano. When Ashton left school at the age of 15 he was already an accomplished pianist. He played in a jazz trio, The Tony Ashton Trio with drummer John Laidlaw and bass player Pete Shelton in 1961 and 1962 at the Picador Club in Blackpool. Although his work began during the Beatles era, his roots lay firmly in soul, jazz and the blues. After playing with various Blackpool bands, Ashton was invited to join the Liverpool group The Remo Four as organist and vocalist. The group spent some time being the resident band at the Star Club in Hamburg; they followed this with a US tour accompanying the Beatles. They recorded some singles but their best work came in 1966 when they released their album Smile. Before they broke up in 1968 they backed George Harrison on his album Wonderwall Music.

Career
At the end of the 1960s Ashton formed a new group with Remo drummer Roy Dyke and bass player Kim Gardner. They called themselves Ashton, Gardner and Dyke. Their music, which was all composed by Ashton, was a fusion of R&B and jazz. The trio recorded three albums, but gained recognition in the United Kingdom in 1971, when the single "Resurrection Shuffle" reached number three on the UK Singles Chart. Following this sudden success they failed to get any more hit singles and broke up in 1973. Ashton said: "The hit backfired on us and we ended up playing cabaret again. The best thing we did was playing with Herbie Mann at Ronnie Scott's. We wanted to be an album band, but once you've got a big hit, you're in the pop league." Ashton also played with The Executives, The Mastersounds and on sessions with Jerry Lee Lewis, George Harrison, Eric Clapton and Paul McCartney. When Ashton, Gardner and Dyke broke up in 1973 Ashton briefly joined Family, and played a prominent role on the last Family album It's Only A Movie, sharing lead vocal duties with Roger Chapman on the title track and also on "Sweet Desiree".

Tony met Deep Purple in the early 1970s, when the last recording of Ashton, Gardner and Dyke was a collaboration with keyboardist Jon Lord on the soundtrack for a b-movie called The Last Rebel. In the meantime, Ashton had appeared on Jon Lord's first solo album Gemini Suite in 1971. In 1973, Ashton joined the group Family for their last album and tour. That same year, he and David Coverdale and Glenn Hughes were guest vocalists on Jon Lord's second album Windows. Ashton and Lord became close friends. In the summer of 1974, during a break in Deep Purple's busy touring schedule, Tony Ashton and Jon Lord recorded their album First of the Big Bands. This project was launched with a gig at the London Palladium the same year and the BBC taped a special live appearance at Golders Green Hippodrome in London. The album of this show combines rhythm and blues, boogie piano and Hammond organ with a big band. Ashton also contributed to Roger Glover's Butterfly Ball project. In these years, Ashton and Lord found a second home in Zermatt, an alpine resort in Switzerland, sometimes to ski, but more often to provide non-profit gigs in a unique complex (one hotel-two night-clubs-two restaurants and four pubs) called "Hotel Post" which was run by American-born Karl Ivarsson. Ashton managed to come to the place almost until his death, and Jon Lord was a regular visitor until his death even though the hotel did not exist anymore.

In August 1976, when Deep Purple split, Jon Lord and Ian Paice combined with Tony Ashton. The result was the formation of Paice Ashton Lord, a band rooted in funk, jazz and rock. The line-up was completed by future Whitesnake guitarist Bernie Marsden and bassist Paul Martinez. They recorded Malice in Wonderland in Munich and a nationwide tour of the UK was set in motion. The tour was cancelled while still in progress because of large financial losses. The band broke up leaving Ashton without a record deal and poor prospects.

During the eighties Ashton co-hosted a TV show with Rick Wakeman called GasTank. The show was aired every two weeks and, on each episode, there were guests ranging from Phil Lynott to Ian Paice who sat in with the show's in-house band led by Ashton and Wakeman (others were Tony Fernandez and Chas Cronk). In between performances, the guests were interviewed by Wakeman.  In 1984, Ashton was given a very small budget to record an album for EMI in Switzerland. The result was the album Live in the Studio, recorded in less than three days. After that, Ashton went through some hard times due to ill health and lack of work. Although he continued to perform sporadically, he did not release anything until 1988 with a single called "Saturday Night and Sunday Morning". In 1986 he married Sandra Naidoo and adopted her daughter Indira.

Final years
By the early 1990s, Tony Ashton began to develop his second career as an artist. Many of Ashton's paintings were bought by the television presenter and DJ Chris Evans for exhibition at his art gallery, Well Hung, in Notting Hill. Apart from selling a lot of paintings (ink drawings and oil/acrylic), his work can be seen on the covers of various CDs, including his maxi-single Mr Ashton Sings Big Red and Other Love Songs. Together they played at various Festivals (in Norway and in the UK). 

In 2000, when he became seriously ill, a special benefit concert was recorded and filmed at EMI's Abbey Road Studios, featuring the many diverse talents of a number of Ashton's friends and colleagues over the years, including Jon Lord, Ian Paice, Micky Moody, Bernie Marsden, Howie Casey, Chris Barber, John Entwistle, Zak Starkey, Pete York, Zoot Money, Joe Brown, Geoff Emerick, Mike Figgis and Ewan McGregor. In the early nineties, Ashton also wrote the first of a planned trilogy of books, which has tales of various aspects of his career including Paice Ashton Lord, the Gastank TV series, and his love of Zermatt in Switzerland, which he first visited with Ashton Gardner & Dyke in 1970, and which gave him the title for the book: Zermattitis: a musicians' guide to going downhill fast.  It has been recently published by Wymer Publishing, as a limited edition with a DVD of rare and previously unreleased film of Ashton Gardner & Dyke, including a live performance from Montreux Jazz Festival 1970.

Tony Ashton died from cancer on 28 May 2001 at his home in London at the age of 55.

Discography

Albums

Live albums

Videos

Singles/EPs

Session work/appearances

References

External links
 
 Tony Ashton art gallery
 A Tribute to Tony Ashton
 Tony Ashton in Belsize Park
 

Family (band) members
1946 births
2001 deaths
People from Blackburn
English rock pianists
English rock keyboardists
English rock singers
20th-century English singers
20th-century British pianists
Deaths from cancer in England
Chicken Shack members
Paice Ashton Lord members
Ashton, Gardner and Dyke members